Rumun Ndur (born July 7, 1975) is a Nigerian-born Canadian former professional ice hockey player. Ndur played in the National Hockey League (NHL) for the Buffalo Sabres, the New York Rangers, and the Atlanta Thrashers. Ndur was the first Nigerian-born player to play in the NHL. He was born in Nigeria but grew up in Hearst, Ontario.

Playing career
Ndur moved to Union, Ontario (near London) and played minor hockey for the St. Thomas Travelers. Ndur played for the Belmont Pests Jr.D. (1990–91) and Clearwater Steeplejacks Jr.C. (1991–92) clubs of the Ontario Hockey Association. Ndur was drafted in the ninth round (129th overall) by the Guelph Storm in the 1992 Ontario Hockey League (OHL) Priority Selection.

He was drafted by the Sabres in the 1994 NHL Entry Draft in the third round, 69th overall. In 1996 he won the Calder Cup with the Rochester Americans. He made his NHL debut in 1996–97 with the Sabres. In 1998–99 he was traded to the New York Rangers and just a year later he was traded to Atlanta, and played 27 games with them during the 1999–2000 NHL season.
Ndur played a total of 69 games in NHL, scoring 5 points (2 goals, 3 assists) with 137 penalty minutes.

At the end of the 2005-06 season Ndur signed with HK Jesenice of the Slovenian Ice Hockey League, thus becoming first African to play for a team in Slovenia. He played 14 games, scoring 2 goals and 3 assists and also amassing 79 penalty minutes. He had a memorable fight with Boštjan Groznik, a tough enforcer. That season Ndur won the Slovenian Championship.

With the Coventry Blaze Ndur played just two games of the 2007–08 season before suffering from a neck injury, ruling him out for the season. In May 2008, Ndur was released by Coventry. Ndur went on to sign with the Nottingham Panthers of the EIHL for the 2008-09 season before returning to North America to sign with the Muskegon Lumberjacks of the International Hockey League before retiring.

Career statistics

Regular season and playoffs

References

External links
 

1975 births
Living people
Atlanta Thrashers players
Black Canadian ice hockey players
Buffalo Sabres draft picks
Buffalo Sabres players
Canadian expatriate ice hockey players in Austria
Canadian expatriate ice hockey players in England
Canadian ice hockey defencemen
Columbus Cottonmouths (ECHL) players
Coventry Blaze players
Danbury Trashers players
Graz 99ers players
Guelph Storm players
Hartford Wolf Pack players
HK Acroni Jesenice players
Ice hockey people from Ontario
Kalamazoo Wings (UHL) players
Muskegon Lumberjacks players
New York Rangers players
Nigerian emigrants to Canada
Norfolk Admirals players
Nottingham Panthers players
Orlando Solar Bears (IHL) players
People from Hearst, Ontario
Rochester Americans players